Sekotong or Sekotong Peninsula (Indonesian: Semenanjung Sekotong) is a peninsula in the south-west of Lombok Island, Indonesia.

References

External links
Lonely Planet

Peninsulas of Indonesia
Landforms of Lombok
Landforms of West Nusa Tenggara